Tyneside Stories & Recitations  (or to give it is’s full title "Tyneside Stories and Recitations, Collected, Edited & Told by C. E. Catcheside-Warrington – (here the number is stated) – J. G. Windows Ltd., Central Arcade, Newcastle”) is a Chapbook of Geordie folk songs consisting of six volumes. As it stated on the covers, the publications were compiled and edited by Charles Ernest Catcheside-Warrington.

The books cost initially 1/= (One Shilling), and although undated, it is thought that the books were published in the 1930s, although according to "A Dictionary of North East Dialect" 2005 they were printed in 1917.
.

The publication 
Charles Ernest Catcheside-Warrington.edited the six volumes of "Tyneside Stories & Recitations", a series of small booklets each of around 32 pages long and containing a mixture of songs, verse, recitations and stories, all by local Tyneside writers, some well-known, others new to the readers.

The contents of these volumes, unlike the previous four volumes of "Tyneside Songs", are less value historically, but nevertheless give the readers a feel of the lives and times of previous generations.

Contents 
The volumes and their contents are below :-

See also 
Geordie dialect words
Charles Ernest Catcheside-Warrington
Catcheside-Warrington's Tyneside Songs

References

External links
 Tyneside Song
 Bards of Newcastle

English folk songs
Songs related to Newcastle upon Tyne
Northumbrian folklore
Music books